Honky (also spelled honkie or sometimes honkey) is a derogatory term used to refer to white people, predominantly heard in the United States.

The first recorded use of "honky" in this context may date back to 1946, although the use of "honky-tonk" occurred in films well before that time.

Etymology
The exact origins of the word are generally unknown and postulations about the subject vary.

Hungarian
Honky may be a variant of hunky, which was a derivative of Bohunk, a slur for various Slavic and Hungarian immigrants who moved to America from the Austro-Hungarian Empire in the early 1900s.

Wolof
Honky may also derive from the term "xonq nopp" which, in the West African language Wolof, literally means "red-eared person". The term may have originated with Wolof-speaking people brought to the U.S. It has been used by Black Americans as a pejorative for White people.

Other
The phrase honky-tonk refers to a particular type of country music, most commonly provided at bars for its patrons, or more commonly, may even refer to the bar itself.

Honky may have come from coal miners in Oak Hill, West Virginia. The miners were segregated; Blacks in one section, Anglo-Whites in another. Foreigners who could not speak English, mostly Whites, were separated from both groups into an area known as "Hunk Hill". These male laborers were known as "Hunkies".

The term may have begun in the meat packing plants of Chicago. According to Robert Hendrickson, author of the Encyclopedia of Word and Phrase Origins, Black workers in Chicago meatpacking plants picked up the term from White workers and began applying it indiscriminately to all Whites.

Notable uses

Honky was adopted as a pejorative in 1967 by Black Power militants within Student Nonviolent Coordinating Committee (SNCC) seeking a rebuttal for the term nigger. The Department of Defense stated in 1967 that National Chairman of the SNCC, H. Rap Brown, told a Black audience in Cambridge that "You should burn that school down and then go take over the honkie's school" on June 24, 1967. Brown went on to say: "[I]f America don't come 'round, we got to burn it down. You better get some guns, brother. The only thing the honky respects is a gun. You give me a gun and tell me to shoot my enemy, I might shoot Lady Bird."

Honky has occasionally been used even for White allies of African Americans, as seen in the 1968 trial of Black Panther Party member Huey Newton, when fellow Panther Eldridge Cleaver created pins for Newton's White supporters stating "Honkies for Huey".

"Father of the Blues" W. C. Handy wrote of "Negroes and hunkies" in his autobiography.

Use in music

In the 2012 rap song "Thrift Shop" by Macklemore & Ryan Lewis ft. Wanz, "Damn, that's a cold ass honkey!" is used in reference to Macklemore and his secondhand clothes. Eminem, who is also a White American rapper, uses the line "He looked at me and said, 'You gonna die honkey!'" in 1999's "Brain Damage." "Play That Funky Music," a 1976 disco/funk hit by Wild Cherry about a rock band adapting to the rise of disco, substitutes "honky" for "White boy" in the final chorus of the uncensored version. The British band Hot Chocolate used "honky" and "spook" in their controversial 1973 hit single Brother Louie about an interracial relationship as the terms chosen by the respective fathers to slur their child's newfound lover.    

Other uses of "honky" in music include Honky (an album by Melvins), Honky Reduction (an album by Agoraphobic Nosebleed), MC Honky (DJ stage persona), Honky Château (an album by Elton John, the first track on which is "Honky Cat"), Talkin' Honky Blues (an album by Buck 65), and Honky (an album by Keith Emerson). Honky's Ladder is a 1996 EP by The Afghan Whigs.

The Chicago style of polka music is also known as honky polka. The etymologically unrelated   word "honky-tonk" occurs often in country music, referring since the late 19th century to working-class nightclubs where country music is played.

Use in television and film

In film, there were some movies using "honky" without any derogatory connotation. Honky Tonk is a 1929 American musical film starring Sophie Tucker. And Honky Tonk is also a 1941 black-and-white Western film starring Clark Gable and Lana Turner.

In the 1958 movie The Defiant Ones, Tony Curtis' character John "Joker" Jackson refers to himself as "a honky".

Honky is a 1971 movie based on an interracial relationship, starring Brenda Sykes as Sheila Smith and John Neilson as Wayne "Honky" Devine. Honky Tonk is also a 1974 Western film starring Richard Crenna and Margot Kidder. Additionally, Honkytonk Man is a 1982 drama film set in the Great Depression. Clint Eastwood, who produced and directed the film, stars in the film with his son, Kyle Eastwood.

In the 1973 James Bond movie Live and Let Die, Bond is referred to as "the honky" on three occasions when captured by exclusively Black adversaries.

In a sketch on Saturday Night Live (SNL), Chevy Chase and Richard Pryor used both nigger (Chase) and honky (Pryor) in reference to one another during a "racist word association interview". During this period, Steve Martin (as musical guest and stand-up regular on SNL) performed a rendition of "King Tut" which contained the word honky in its lyrics.

In the movie National Lampoon's Vacation when the Griswolds visit East St. Louis, a local gang removes the wheel covers and write "Honky Lips" in black paint on the right side of the vehicle.

On the TV series The Jeffersons, George Jefferson regularly referred to a White person as a honky (or Whitey) as did Redd Foxx on Sanford and Son. This word would later be popularized in episodes of Mork & Mindy by Robin Williams and Jonathan Winters.

The neighbor, (Bill Reynolds), on the British sitcom Love Thy Neighbour, played by Rudolph Walker, would often refer to his bigoted White neighbor (Jack Smethurst), (Eddie Booth), as "Honky". Booth, in reply, regularly retaliated by referring to Reynolds as Sambo (racial term).

In the Family Guy episode "Brian Sings and Swings", Peter Griffin uses the word to try to get out of jury duty.

These and other shows, as exemplified by the controversial All in the Family, attempted to expose racism and prejudice as an issue in society using the subversive weapon of humor. However, the effect that this theme had on television created both negative and positive criticism and the use of anti-racist messages actually escalates the use of racial slurs. The presence of higher education may countermand this effect.

In Season 2, Episode 1 of Da Ali G Show ("Law"), Ali G uses the term to refer to a White male while radioing the dispatcher at the Philadelphia Police Academy, while he uses the term "brother" to refer to a Black person, despite being White himself.

On the TV series Barney Miller, Season 5, Episode 8, "Loan Shark", Arthur Dietrich gives an etymology of the word "honky", claiming it was "coined by Blacks in the 1950s in reference to the nasal tone of Caucasians".

One of the Harlem Globetrotters refers to the robot Bender as "silver honky" in the episode "Time Keeps On Slippin' of the cartoon series Futurama.

The animated television series Black Dynamite extensively uses the word "honky" as a reference to White people, especially the Man. In Episode 4 of Season 1, 10-year-old Black Dynamite is competing in a spelling bee, when he is asked to spell the word "White" he spells it out as "H-O-N-K-Y". In Episode 8 of Season 1, a giant albino ape is referred to as "Honky Kong".

See also

 Buckra
 Cracker
 Hillbilly
 List of ethnic slurs
 Redneck
 Whitey (slang)
 White Anglo-Saxon Protestants

References

Pejorative terms for white people